Metriochroa syringae is a moth of the family Gracillariidae. It is known from Hokkaido island in Japan.

The wingspan is 5.6-6.5 mm.

The larvae feed on Syringa reticulata. They mine the leaves of their host plant. The mine starts as a narrowly linear mine. Later, it gradually widens into a very long and irregularly curved gallery that is sometimes fused into a large blotch. The last sap-feeding larva makes an inter parenchymal mine, so that the mine is seen from the upper side of the leaf as a trace of pale greenish mottles in this stage. A pupal chamber is found within the mine, but not always at the end of the mine. It is ellipsoidal, with very slightly swollen upper and lower sides.

References

Phyllocnistinae
Moths of Japan